Kellermensch is a 2009 experimental rock album released by Kellermensch.

Track listings

In 2011, Kellermensch acquired a deal with Universal and the album was re-released with the merging of the first and the EP, while missing the tracks Dirt in the Ground and Loss.

Personnel
 Christian Sindermann - Growled vocals
 Sebastian Wolff - electric guitar, clean and screamed vocals, Hammond organ B-3, pump organ, piano and tambourine
 Anders Trans - drums
 Claudio Wolff - bass guitar
 Jan V. Laursen - electric guitar
 John V. Laursen - upright bass

Additional musicians
 Iben Wiene Rathje - violin
 Kirstine F. Jessing - viola
 Jens Kristian Andersen - upright bass
 Søren Storm - violin
 Søren Skouboe - vocals on Nothing Left
 Jesper K. Jakobsen - Hammond organ

Other credits
 Artwork by Tony Clark, courtesy of the artist and Boslyn Oxley9 Gallery, Sydney
 Layout by Persona Non Grata
 A&R: Michael Iversen for Persona Non Grata Records

References

2009 albums